Cloonee Lough, or the Cloonee Loughs, is a system of three freshwater lakes in County Kerry, Ireland, consisting of upper Cloonee Lough, middle Cloonee Lough and lower Cloonee Lough.

Geography and hydrology
The lakes are oligotrophic. Upper Cloonee Lough is fed by the Ameen River from Inchiquin Lough. Lower Cloonee Lough is connected to the middle and upper lakes by the Beal-na-Shannin River and drains into the Kenmare River estuary via the Cloonee River.

Natural history
Fish species in the Cloonee Loughs include Arctic char, brown trout, sea trout and sometimes young Atlantic salmon (grilse). The Cloonee Loughs are part of the Cloonee and Inchiquin Loughs, Uragh Wood Special Area of Conservation.

See also
List of loughs in Ireland

References

Lakes of County Kerry